In the Air is the third studio album by American progressive house DJ Morgan Page released on April 3, 2012 by Nettwerk.

Track listing

External links
 In the Air at allmusic

2012 albums
Morgan Page albums